Turkeycock Wildlife Management Area is a  Wildlife Management Area (WMA) along the ridge of Turkeycock Mountain northeast of Martinsville, Virginia. It straddles the border between Franklin and Henry counties. The area is primarily forest, with several open areas for wildlife located around the property. A number of small streams drain the land, and a pond is located near its southwestern corner. Most wildlife management in the area has been limited to improving timber quality through the sale of wood.

Turkeycock WMA is owned and maintained by the Virginia Department of Game and Inland Fisheries. The area is open to the public for hunting, trapping, fishing, hiking, horseback riding, and primitive camping. Access for persons 17 years of age or older requires a valid hunting or fishing permit, or a WMA access permit.

See also
 List of Virginia Wildlife Management Areas

References

External links
Virginia Department of Game and Inland Fisheries: Turkeycock Wildlife Management Area

Wildlife management areas of Virginia
Protected areas of Franklin County, Virginia
Protected areas of Henry County, Virginia